Mario Schönenberger (born 18 May 1986) is a Swiss professional footballer who currently plays for FC Wohlen.

External links
 

1986 births
Living people
Swiss men's footballers
FC Wil players
FC Thun players
SC Kriens players
FC St. Gallen players
FC Wohlen players
Swiss Super League players
Swiss Challenge League players
Association football midfielders